Cato T. Laurencin, M.D., Ph.D., FREng SLMH, (St. Lucia, Medal of Honor, Gold) (born January 15, 1959) is an American engineer, physician, scientist, innovator and a University Professor of the University of Connecticut (one of two at the University).

He is currently the Chief Executive Officer of The Connecticut Convergence Institute for Translation in Regenerative Engineering.

Dr. Laurencin is regarded as the founder of the field of Regenerative Engineering. He is the Editor-in-Chief of the journal Regenerative Engineering and Translational Medicine and Founder and president of the Regenerative Engineering Society. In engineering, medicine, science, and innovation, he is an elected member of the National Academy of Engineering, an elected member of the National Academy of Medicine, an elected member of the National Academy of Sciences, and an elected Fellow of the National Academy of Inventors. He is the first surgeon in history to be elected to all four academies. He is the first person to receive both the oldest/highest awards from the National Academy of Engineering (the Simon Ramo Founder's Award) and the oldest/highest National Academy of Medicine (the Walsh McDermott Medal).

In science, Dr. Laurencin received the Philip Hague Abelson Prize, the highest honor of the American Association for the Advancement of Science, for "signal contributions to the advancement of science in the United States" for his work in Regenerative Engineering.

In innovation, Laurencin was awarded the National Medal of Technology and Innovation, America's highest honor for technological advancement, awarded by President Barack Obama in ceremonies at the White House.

Background and personal life
Laurencin was born and raised in the inner city of North Philadelphia. He is an alumnus of Central High School. He then earned a B.S.E. in chemical engineering from Princeton University. He earned an M.D., magna cum laude, from the Harvard Medical School, and received the Robinson Award for Surgery. Simultaneously he earned his Ph.D. in biochemical engineering/biotechnology from MIT, where he was named a Hugh Hampton Young Fellow. Laurencin and his wife have three children.

Contributions to engineering and medicine
Laurencin is known as a world leader in biomaterials, polymeric materials science, nanotechnology, stem cell science, drug delivery systems, and a field he has pioneered, regenerative engineering. Laurencin's papers and patents have had broad impact on  human health, launching the use of nanotechnology in musculoskeletal regeneration and ushering in a new era in orthopaedic therapies. He and his colleagues were the first to develop nanofiber technologies for tissue regeneration. He pioneered the development of polymer-ceramic systems for bone regeneration, and inspired technologies on the market for bone repair/regeneration and for bioceramic implants such as interference screws for musculoskeletal repair.

Laurencin has worked in the development of systems for soft tissue regeneration. He invented the Laurencin-Cooper ligament (LC ligament) for ACL regeneration, and engineered grafts for shoulder rotator cuff tendon repair and regeneration. National Geographic named the LC Ligament one of its "100 Scientific Discoveries that Changed the World" in 2012.

He is a highly cited researcher and has authored over 500 scientific papers and patents.

Awards and honors

Laurencin received the National Institutes of Health NIH Director's Pioneer Grant Award and the National Science Foundation NSF Emerging Frontiers in Research and Innovation Grant Award, the agencies' highest grant awards for innovation and breakthrough research.

Dr. Laurencin is an Academician and Member (foreign) of the Chinese Academy of Engineering. He is a Fellow of the African Academy of Sciences, a Fellow of the World Academy of Sciences, a Fellow of the Indian National Academy of Sciences and a Fellow of the Indian National Academy of Engineering. In 2021, he was elected member of the U. S. National Academy of Sciences.
 2022 - International Fellow, UK Royal Academy of Engineering
 2022 - Fellow, Indian Academy of Sciences
 2022 - Fellow, Academia Europaea
 2022 - American Orthopaedic Association Distinguished Contributions to Orthopaedic Surgery Award
 2022 - Named to Connecticut's Top Doctors
 2022 - American Orthopaedic Association Award Hall of Fame
 2022 - Fellow, European Academy of Sciences and Techniques of Senegal, Marshall Urist Award, Orthopaedic Research Society
 2022 - Robert A. Pritzker Distinguished Lectureship Award, Biomedical Engineering Society
 2022 - Diversity Award, American Academy of Orhtopaedic Surgeons
 2022 - The Order of St. Lucia (St. Lucia Medal of Honor - Gold) 
 2022 - Named to Top Most Influential Black Scholars in last 30 years (engineering), Academic Influence
 2022 - Fellow, National Academy of Sciences
 2021 - Recipient, Hoover Medal, AIChE / ASME / ASCE / AIME / IEEE
 2021 - Recipient, Spingarn Medal, NAACP
 2021 - Recipient, Kappa Delta Ann Doner Vaughn Award, often referred to as the "Nobel Prize of Orthopaedic Surgery."
2020 - Recipient, Herbert W. Nickens Award
2020 - Recipient, James E. Bailey Award in Biomedical Engineering, American Institute of Chemical Engineers
 2020 - Listed as CrossTalk's 100 Inspiring Black Scientists in America
 2020 - Recipient of the Acta Biomaterialia Gold Medal
 2020 - Mike Hogg Award and Lecture, MD Anderson Cancer Center
 2020 - Nelson W. Taylor Lecture and Award, Pennsylvania State University
 2019 - Recipient, UNESCO-Equatorial Guinea International Prize for Research in the Life Sciences
 2019 - Recipient, E.E. Just Lecture Award, American Society for Cell Biology
 2019 - Recipient, Walsh McDermott Award, National Academy of Medicine
 2019 - Recipient, Simon Ramo Founders Award, National Academy of Engineering
 2019 - Recipient, Global Biomaterials Leadership Award, Chinese Association of Biomaterials
 2019 - Recipient, The American Association for the Advancement of Science Philip Hauge Abelson Prize 'for significant contributions to the advancement of science in the United States'
 2018 - Les Hsun Lecture Award, Shenyang University, Shenyang, China
 2017 - Distinguished Engineering Educator Award for 2017 (from Engineer's Council)
 2016 - Laureate, National Medal of Technology and Innovation
 2015 - Pioneer of Diversity Award, American Institute of Chemical Engineers
 2015 - Living Legend Award, National Medical Association
 2015 - Cato T. Laurencin, M.D., Ph.D., Traveling Fellow Award established by the Society for Biomaterials
 2015 - Lifetime Achievement Award, West Indian Foundation
 2015 - Plenary Speaker and Plenary Award, American Ceramic Society
 2014 - NIH Director's Pioneer Award
 2014 - Percy Julian Medal, the highest honor of the National Organization of Black Chemists and Chemical Engineers (NOBCChe)

Works in engineering

Chemical engineering 
Dr. Laurencin is a Professor of Chemical and Biomolecular Engineering at the University of Connecticut. In Chemical Engineering, Dr. Laurencin was named one of the 100 Engineers of the Modern Era by the American Institute of Chemical Engineers for his work in pioneering polymer-ceramic systems for musculoskeletal use. A Fellow of the American Institute of Chemical Engineers, he won the William Grimes Award from the American Institute of Chemical Engineers and serves on the board of directors of the American Institute of Chemical Engineers with a term from 2018 to 2021. He is the Founder and president of the Regenerative Engineering Society, a community within the American Institute of Chemical Engineers, and is the Editor-in-Chief of Regenerative Engineering and Translational Medicine, published by Springer/Nature. He is the recipient of the James Bailey Award of the American Institute of Chemical Engineers and received the Percy Julian Medal, the highest award of the National Organization of Black Chemists and Chemical Engineers. He is a fellow of the American Chemical Society of polymeric science and engineering and chemistry. He was the recipient of the Founders Award by the AIChE in 2022.  The AIChE created the Cato T. Laurencin Award for the American Regenerating Society.

Materials science and engineering 
Dr. Laurencin is a Professor of Materials Science and Engineering at the University of Connecticut. In Materials Science and Engineering, he is a Fellow of the Materials Research Society and has been the Fred Kavli Distinguished Lecturer and Plenary Speaker for the Materials Research Society. He is a fellow and life member of the American Ceramic Society and has delivered two of their most prestigious lectures. He has served as the Edward Orton, Jr., Memorial Lecturer and the Rustum Roy Lecturer for the American Ceramic Society. He has been named one of the most highly cited researchers in Material Science and Engineering (Scopus) and his work on engineered materials for soft tissue regeneration was highlighted by National Geographic magazine in its 100 Scientific Discoveries that Changed the World edition. He was awarded the 2020 Von Hippel Award from the Materials Research Society.

Biomedical engineering 
Dr. Laurencin is a Professor of Biomedical Engineering. His work has been honored at the White House, receiving the Presidential Faculty Fellow Award from President Bill Clinton. He is a Fellow of the International Academy of Medical and Biological Engineering. He is an International Fellow in Biomaterials Science and Engineering and a Fellow of the American Institute for Medical and Biomedical Engineering, and a Fellow of the Biomedical Engineering Society. His work was honored by Scientific American magazine as one of the "50 Greatest Achievements in Science" in 2007. In 2011, Dr. Laurencin was elected a member of the National Academy of Engineering for biomaterial science, drug delivery, and tissue engineering involving musculoskeletal systems, and for academic leadership.

Dr. Laurencin was named the 2009 winner of the Pierre Galletti Award, medical and biological engineering's highest honor. Dr. Laurencin is active in technology development. In 2012, his work in musculoskeletal tissue regeneration was featured in National Geographic magazine's "100 Discoveries that Changed Our World" edition.

In addition, he received the Technology, Innovation and Development Award from the Society for Biomaterials in 2013 for key scientific and technical innovation and leadership in translational research. In Connecticut, he was named Academic Entrepreneur of the Year by Connecticut Cure. He received the Connecticut Medal of Technology from the Connecticut Academy of Science and Engineering.

Dr. Laurencin was named the winner of the

Work in medicine 
Dr. Laurencin is the Albert and Wilda Van Dusen Distinguished Endowed Professor of Orthopaedic Surgery at the University of Connecticut. He completed residency training at the Harvard Combined Orthopaedic Surgery Program, where he was Chief Resident in Orthopaedic Surgery at the Beth Israel Hospital, Harvard Medical School. He served as Vice President for Health Affairs and Dean of the School of Medicine at the University of Connecticut. Previous to that, he served as the Lillian T. Pratt Distinguished Professor of Orthopaedic Surgery and Orthopaedic Surgeon-In-Chief at the University of Virginia Health System.

A board certified shoulder and knee surgeon, Dr. Laurencin has been named to "America's Leading Physicians" by Black Enterprise magazine. He has served as a ringside boxing physician and has been a physician for the USA Boxing men's elite team. He has been a member of the USA Boxing National Medical Advisory Board. Dr. Laurencin also serves as the Commissioner of Boxing for the state of Connecticut. Dr. Laurencin is a Fellow of the American Academy of Orthopaedic Surgeons, a Fellow of the American Orthopaedic Association, a Fellow of the American College of Surgeons, and a member of the American's Leading Doctors edition. He received the Nicolas Andry Award, the highest honor of the Association of Bone and Joint Surgeons. He is currently the only living orthopaedic surgeon elected to the American Academy of Arts and Sciences. He received an honorary degree from the Mount Sinai School of Medicine in 2018.

Dr. Laurencin received the 2021 Kappa Delta Ann Doner Vaughn Award from the American Society of Orthopaedic Surgeons.

He is the creator of the IDEAL path for achieving justice and equity.

Work in equity and justice 
Dr. Laurencin is active in mentoring, especially underrepresented minority students. In 2020, the Association of American Medical Colleges (AAMC) announced Dr. Laurencin as the recipient of the Herbert W. Nickens Award. The award was bestowed upon Dr. Laurencin for his groundbreaking work in social justice, equity and fairness.

He received the American Association for the Advancement of Science (AAAS) Mentor Award, the Beckman Award for Mentoring, and the Presidential Award for Excellence in Science, Math and Engineering Mentoring in ceremonies at the White House. The Society for Biomaterials established The Cato T. Laurencin, M.D., Ph.D., Travel Fellowship in his honor, given to underrepresented minority students pursuing research. He received an honorary degree from Lincoln University, one of the oldest historically Black colleges in the country.

Dr. Laurencin is an expert in public health, especially as it pertains to ethnic minority health and health disparities. Academically, he completed the Program in African-American Studies at Princeton University. He is a core faculty member of the Africana Studies Institute at the University of Connecticut, and is Editor-in-Chief of the Journal of Racial and Ethnic Health Disparities, published by Springer/Nature, a leading journal in the field. He has written landmark papers, including the first paper in the referred literature showing high levels of COVID-19 cases and deaths in Blacks. He has served as the Chair of the National Academy of Sciences Roundtable on Black Men and Black Women in Science, Engineering, and Medicine.

Dr. Laurencin co-founded the W. Montague Cobb/NMA Health Institute, dedicated to addressing racial health disparities, and served as its first Chair of the Board. He served on the board of trustees of the National Medical Association for over a decade and was Speaker of the House of Delegates of the National Medical Association. The W. Montague Cobb/NMA Health Institute created the Cato T. Laurencin Lifetime Achievement Award in his honor. It is bestowed at the opening ceremonies of the annual meeting of the National Medical Association.

References

1959 births
Central High School (Philadelphia) alumni
Princeton University alumni
Harvard Medical School alumni
American chief executives
University of Virginia School of Medicine faculty
University of Connecticut faculty
American orthopedic surgeons
Living people
Members of the United States National Academy of Sciences
Members of the United States National Academy of Engineering
African-American physicians
American healthcare managers
African-American scientists
Fellows of the American Institute for Medical and Biological Engineering
Foreign members of the Chinese Academy of Engineering
Academics from Pennsylvania
21st-century African-American people
20th-century African-American people
Members of the National Academy of Medicine
Fellows of the African Academy of Sciences
Associate Fellows of the African Academy of Sciences